Lincoln Howard Blakely (February 12, 1912 – September 28, 1976) was an outfielder in Major League Baseball. He grew up in Oakland, California and attended Oakland Technical High School. He played for the Cincinnati Reds.

References

External links

1912 births
1976 deaths
Major League Baseball outfielders
Cincinnati Reds players
Baseball players from Oakland, California
Nashville Vols players